"China Doll" is a song written by Gerald Cannan and Kenny Cannan and originally recorded and released as a single (Imperial 8156, with "Indian Love Call" on the opposite side) by Slim Whitman.

Track listing

Charts

References 

1952 songs
1952 singles
Imperial Records singles
London Records singles
Slim Whitman songs